John Vincent Kenny (April 6, 1893 – June 2, 1975) was mayor of Jersey City from 1949 to 1953.

Biography
He was born on April 6, 1893. A former ward leader under longtime mayor Frank Hague, he broke with his mentor after Hague engineered the appointment of his nephew, Frank Hague Eggers, in 1947. Kenny put together a commission ticket that broke Hague's 32-year rule. Although he only served as mayor until 1953, he remained the real power in Jersey City and Hudson County for three decades. Known as the  "Little Guy," Kenny put together a machine that grew as corrupt as Hague's machine, though nowhere as efficient in providing city and county services.

His rule was only broken in 1971, when he was prosecuted by the U.S. Attorney's Office for the District of New Jersey and convicted, along with the then-mayor Thomas J. Whelan and former City Council president Thomas Flaherty, in federal court of conspiracy and extortion in a multimillion-dollar political kickback scheme on city and county contracts.

Kenny suffered a heart attack and died on June 2, 1975, in Jersey City. He was buried in Holy Name Cemetery in Jersey City.

References

1893 births
1975 deaths
American political bosses
American Roman Catholics
Mayors of Jersey City, New Jersey
New Jersey Democrats
New Jersey politicians convicted of crimes
Burials at Holy Name Cemetery (Jersey City, New Jersey)
20th-century American politicians